Morgan is a 2012 gay film directed by Michael Akers, produced by Michael D. Akers, Sandon Berg and Israel Ehrisman, and starring Leo Minaya as Morgan Oliver and Jack Kesy as Dean Kagen.

Plot
A young, paralyzed, gay athlete attempts to live his life in a situation far from desirable. After an accident leaves him paralyzed from the waist down, Morgan Oliver (played by Leo Minaya), is first seen wallowing in a state of depression, drowning his sorrows in beer as he watches bicycle racing (the sport that at once defined his sense of purpose and drove him to his catalytic accident) on television. He meets Dean Kagan (played by Jack Kesy) who helps him through the way and a romantic relationship develops between the two. Once Morgan knows about the New York Haven Cycle Race, he decides to take part in the race with the help of Kagan and sponsorship from Tread Bike Shop.

Cast
Leo Minaya as Morgan Oliver
Jack Kesy as Dean Kagen
Ben Budd as Wesley
Theodore Bouloukos as Dr. Thomas
Darra Boyd as Lane Williams
Madalyn McKay as Peg Oliver

Production
Akers and Berg planned on writing a story about a paraplegic while casting for an earlier film Phoenix. A young, handsome wheelchair-using paraplegic actor had submitted his portfolio for a possible role in a film. Although the screenplay for Phoenix had been written and no role was envisioned for a paraplegic acting role, they were intrigued enough by him personally, they decided to write a screenplay around a paraplegic athlete. After many interviews with other wheelchair-using gay men, their collection of stories became the basis for the film Morgan.

Reception
One film reviewer wrote: "Morgan is not a sophisticated film, but it is a very human one. Morgan has an abundance of heart and speaks to the travails of the disabled in a way that is rarely addressed in cinema, queer or otherwise. Well Done."

Soundtrack
Music is by Ryan Rapsys. The film also includes original music by
Diamond Underground
Molly Mguire
Ben Darwish
David Raleigh
Miles the Band
Nicholas Wells

Screenings 
The film was screened at many festivals including
Official selection at Outfest, Los Angeles
Official selection at Cleveland International Film Festival
Official selection at Frameline, San Francisco
Kansas City Gay & Lesbian Film Festival
North Carolina Gay & Lesbian Film Festival
Reeling Chicago Gay & Lesbian Film Festival
Sacramento International Gay & Lesbian Film Festival
San Diego Gay & Lesbian Film Festival
Filmfest homochrom, Cologne & Dortmund, Germany (European premiere)

Awards
"Audience Award" at:
Sacramento International Gay & Lesbian Film Festival
San Diego Gay & Lesbian Film Festival

"Jury Prize" at:
QCinema, Ft. Worth Gay & Lesbian Film Festival
Kansas City Gay & Lesbian Film Festival
Reeling, Chicago Gay & Lesbian Film Festival
Tucson "Out in the Desert" Film Festival

References

External links
 
Official Page on United Gay Network website
Review of the Film in PINK PAGES, India's national gay and lesbian magazine

2012 films
American LGBT-related films
LGBT-related sports drama films
Films about paraplegics or quadriplegics
Films directed by Michael Akers
2012 LGBT-related films
2010s English-language films
2010s American films
American sports drama films
2010s sports drama films